is a Japanese music critic and radio personality, also known as Seisoku Ito and Masa Ito. His work is specialized in heavy metal and hard rock, and he is known as the leading music critic of Japan in this field. He has been quick to introduce new heavy metal bands to Japan, through writing for magazines such as Burrn! and putting them on the air. Ito wrote the initial story draft of the 2022 film , based on the story of Japanese thrash metal band Outrage.

Appearances

TV
 Itō Seisoku no Rock City (Television Kanagawa)
 Itō Seisoku no Rock TV! (BS Fuji)

Radio
 Power Rock Today (Bay FM)
 Rockadom (FM Fuji)
 Rock On (FM802)
 Rock the Nation (Date fm)
 Kyō wa Ichinichi Maru Maru Zanmai (NHK FM)

Bibliography

 Yes Kamigami no Kyōen (Shinkō Gakufu Shuppansha, 1979)
 Michael Schenker Flying V Densetsu (Shinkō Gakufu Shuppansha, March 1982) 
 Cozy Powell Kagirinaki Chōsen (Shinkō Music, November 1983) 
 Heavy Metal no Gyakushū (Shinchosha, April 1985) 
 Sēsoku no Housoku Jōgai Rantō Essay (Shinkō Music, March 1986) 
 Tsumi to Batsu: Official Ozzy Osbourne Story (CBS Sony Publishing, June 1986) 
 Dangen (Shinkō Music, February 1993) 
 Dangen Sono 2 (Shinkō Music, February 1999) 
 Mokugeki Shōgen Heavy Metal no Shōzō (Gakken Publishing, July 2013) 
 Mokugeki Shōgen 2 (Heavy Metal: Tamashii no Tabiji) (Gakken Publishing, August 2014)

References

External links 
 Masanori Ito on FM802
 Masanori Ito's Rock City (Ito Masanori no Rock City), Masanori Ito's show on tvk

1953 births
Japanese music critics
Japanese radio personalities
Japanese music journalists
Living people
People from Hanamaki, Iwate
Senshu University alumni
Writers from Iwate Prefecture